The Children's Hospital of Fudan University (abbreviation: CHFU, colloquially Fudan Children's Hospital) is a national-level tertiary children's hospital in Shanghai, China. It is a university hospital affiliated to Fudan University Shanghai Medical College.  The hospital is located in Minhang District with an outpatient clinic located in Xuhui District.

It has been consistently ranked as the top children's hospital in China, and the first children's hospital in Asia to be accredited by Joint Commission International. In January 2017, the hospital, along with the Shanghai Children's Medical Center, was designated as the National Children's Medical Center (Shanghai), which will be located at a new campus in the Shanghai International Medical Zone in Pudong.

History 

The Children's Hospital of Fudan University was founded in 1952 and was located on Fenglin Rd in Xuhui District, Shanghai. In 2008, the hospital was moved to its current campus in Minhang District, with its new facility having a space of 80,000 square meters.

Ranking and Performance 

Nationally, the hospital is consistently ranked first for general pediatrics, first for pediatric medicine, and second for pediatric surgery. It is currently licensed for 800 inpatient beds, with 35,000 admissions annually. Its outpatient clinics serve over 2.21 million patients annually. As of 2013, the hospital has 1396 employees, with 118 senior staff physicians and 63 postgraduate student advisors.

Clinical Departments 

The hospital is a comprehensive medical center for children, and is a member of International SOS. Clinical departments in all areas of pediatrics are present in the hospital and is organized as follows:

Medicine 
 Pediatric Critical Care Medicine
 Pediatric Infectious Disease
 Neonatology
 Pediatric Respiratory Medicine
 Pediatric Neurology
 Pediatric Hematology
 Pediatric Gastroenterology
 Pediatric Endocrinology, Genetics, and Metabolic Disorders
 Pediatric Nephrology and Rheumatology

Surgery 
 Pediatric Surgery and Neonatal Surgery
 Pediatric Urology
 Surgical Oncology
 Pediatric Orthopedic Surgery
 Pediatric Plastic Surgery

Pediatric Heart Center 
 Pediatric Cardiology
 Pediatric Electrocardiography
 Pediatric Echocardiography
 Pediatric Cardiothoracic Surgery

Other Clinical Departments 
 Child Health
 Pediatric Traditional Chinese Medicine
 Pediatric Anesthesiology
 High-Dependency Care Unit
 Pediatric Dermatology
 Pediatric Dentistry
 Pediatric Otorhinolaryngology
 Child Psychology
 Pediatric Physical Medicine and Rehabilitation
 Pediatric Ophthalmology
 Pediatric Clinical Immunology

Medical Technology Departments 
 Pathology
 Laboratory Medicine
 Radiology
 Nuclear Medicine
 Ultrasonography
 Nutrition
 Pharmacy

Research Institutes 
 Pediatrics Research Institute
 Integrative Medicine Research Institute

Department of Pediatrics 
 Department of Pediatrics, Fudan University Shanghai Medical College

Research 

The hospital has an extensive research program with 470 projects undertaken between 2004 and 2014, with 200 million yuan of funding provided by national organizations, including the Chinese Academy of Sciences and the Ministry of Health of the People's Republic of China.

Between 2003 and 2013, the hospital has published 550 internationally peer-reviewed articles, and is the publisher of the Chinese edition of Pediatrics (journal).

Education and Training 

CHFU is the home to the Department of Pediatrics of Fudan University Shanghai Medical College, and is responsible for the training of 400 undergraduate medical students annually. It is also responsible for the training of over 200 postgraduate fellowship pediatricians annually. It is also licensed as a site for residency training by the Shanghai Municipal Health Bureau.

Expansion 

In August 2020, it was announced that CHFU will undergo an extensive expansion project, adding an additional 450 licensed beds to a total of 1250 beds. This includes the establishment of a clinical neonatal specialist centre and a clinical birth defects centre. In addition, an education centre with an area of 10,206 square metres and an integrated inpatient building with an area of 57,443 square metres will be built

References 

 Children's Hospital of Fudan University
 复旦大学附属儿科医院将扩建，新增450个床位

External links
 Official Website 

Teaching hospitals in Shanghai
Children's hospitals in China
Fudan University
1952 establishments in China
Hospitals established in 1952